In the run up to the Turkish general election scheduled to take place on 14 May 2023, various organisations carry out opinion polling to gauge voting intention in Turkey. Results of such polls are displayed in this article. These polls only include Turkish voters nationwide and do not take into account Turkish expatriates voting abroad. The date range for these opinion polls are from the previous general election, held on 24 June 2018, to the present day.

Poll results are listed in the tables below in reverse chronological order, showing the most recent first, and using the date the survey's fieldwork was done, as opposed to the date of publication. If such date is unknown, the date of publication is given instead. The highest percentage figure in each polling survey is displayed in bold, and the background shaded in the leading party's color. In the instance that there is a tie, then no figure is shaded. The lead column on the right shows the percentage-point difference between the two parties with the highest figures. When a specific poll does not show a data figure for a party, the party's cell corresponding to that poll is shown empty.

First round

Graphical summary

Official campaign polling 
The table below contains polls conducted after the official start of the campaign period on 10 March.

Pre-campaign polling

2023

2022

2021

2020

2018–2019

Second round

Erdoğan vs. Kılıçdaroğlu

Erdoğan vs. İnce

Hypothetical candidates

Erdoğan vs. İmamoğlu

Erdoğan vs. Yavaş

Erdoğan vs. Akşener

2022

2021

Erdoğan vs. Babacan

Erdoğan vs. Gül

Notes

2023 Turkish presidential election
2023 presidential
Turkey presidential